Ali Sokol  (born 8 May 1921 in Rahovec, Kosovo,  died 23 September 1974) was an Albanian pulmonologist .

Early life
Ali Sokol was born into an agricultural family. He was the third of four children of father and mother Hatixhes Solomon. It is unknown the exact date of birth but the most reliable date is May 8 year in 1921.

The Elementary school of his birthplace was in the Serbian language because at that time all schools in his country were in Serbo-Croat or Slovene. Due to his success in school, continuation of education in the Medrese of Skoplje from 1933 until 1941 when he finished high school. During the time when he was last year, began World War II .

After the start of World War II, he returned to Orahovac. Ethnic Albanian students were invited by the Ministry of Education of Albania to continue their studies in Italy. In 1941 the Faculty of Agriculture recorded in Pizza, Italy, where he stood out as a student, but when Italy capitulated, studies for the fourth year continued in Vienna, where they could not perform well because of the capitulation of the fascist countries. Several times he was jailed by Italian kuislingët due to anti-fascist activities during the holidays.

On June 15, he returned from Vienna in Orahovac for administrative work in the municipality of Orahovac, and later in Pristina he presented the request to continue studies of agronomy. This request was refused, but he was given scholarships to study medicine in Belgrade on condition that he return home afterwards. There he married a girl from Romania and had two children (architect and technologist).

In the spring of year 1946, he was reported by the communists authorities and expelled from the Popular Front (later Yugoslav Socialist League), he got citizenship from Yugoslavia.

In 1947, while studying in Belgrade, the OZN raided the home of the parents of his Orahovac to find evidence of his anti-communism but found nothing except vocational education and a writing machine.

In 1949, he was invited to a meeting by the NDSH (National Democratic Party of Albania) in Orahovac where he would be elected Foreign Minister due to his education and knowledge of six languages. He departed Belgrade for Kosovo Polje, but due to inability to travel to Orahovac that day, he spent the night in Pristina. This was a stroke of luck because the next day, all 45 members of NDSH were caught and imprisoned by the OZN, the next day he returned to Belgrade .

During the time spent in Belgrade, he tried to carry out tests that were left out since the last Faculty of Agricultures, but was not accepted and completed years of university because he had performed in a fascist state. For this reason, entering a faculty of medicine in Belgrade (where he graduated after only four years), he was forced several times to require acceptance of Yugoslav statehood by the president then to get a diploma.

The Ali Sokol Middle School of Medicine in Pristina bears his name.

Military service
Immediately after he became the head faculty at the age of 29 years, the regime had forced him to carry out military service for one year in Niš, although the laws of time, after the age of 27 years of military service was not compulsory.

During the time when military service was conducted reported several times by different defamation because of his nationality and the fact that he had studied the fascist countries.

Activity
After military service performed back in Kosovo and employed in the Prizren hospital, the department of lung diseases, which together with Daut Mustafa, he made many great achievements, especially in the field of advising the population with the aim to eradicate tuberculosis, a disease which at that time was taking very many lives of people.

After several years working in Prizren, he went to Belgrade to become a specialist for lung diseases, of which especially tuberculosis.

As a specialist in pulmonary diseases opens the lung diseases ward in Đakovica (worked there for three years), which was also very widespread tuberculosis.

About the year 1960 goes to Pristina to continue the fight against Tuberculosis and Lung Hospital (buildings of the Ministry of Health of Kosovo ) where they were regularly admitted about 100 patients. He was appointed director of the division of lung diseases and tuberculosis. He earned the distinction of a fierce combatant against tuberculosis, which at that time was taking very many lives, especially in poor countries like Kosovo. In Pristina also worked as a teacher ( Docent ) in the field of Pulmologie.

Work in this hospital was quite difficult because punohej with equipment before World War II. There he worked to death on September 23 of year 1974, from a heart attack.

Besides literature of Albanian, he knew the Serbian, German, Italian, Turkish and Arabic, and for research work using the English and French

For his work in life, after death, was named "Primarus Docent" by the Faculty of Medicine in Pristina and for his work wrote many eminent scientists of the time.

For the achievements and great efforts in fight against tuberculosis and other lung diseases, was awarded the Labor Medal by the Government of that time, and in honor of his high school of medicine in Pristina is named after Ali Sokol.

Yugoslav physicians
Yugoslav expatriates in Italy
Yugoslav expatriates in Austria
Kosovan pulmonologists
1974 deaths
1921 births
Kosovo Albanians
People from Orahovac